Events from the year 1897 in Japan.

Incumbents
Emperor: Emperor Meiji
Prime Minister: Matsukata Masayoshi

Governors
Aichi Prefecture: Tokito Konkyo then Egi Kazuyuki
Akita Prefecture: Saburo Iwao
Aomori Prefecture: Naomasa Maki then Ichiro Konoshu
Ehime Prefecture: Chang Masaya Komaki then Yutori Kojiro then Park Shin Maki Naomasa
Fukui Prefecture: Kunizo Arakawa then Denzaburo Hatano then Shingo Seki
Fukushima Prefecture: Akiyama then Kimumichi Nagusami
Gifu Prefecture: Sukeo Kabayama then Yoshinori Yumoto
Gunma Prefecture: Masataka Ishizata
Hiroshima Prefecture: Orita Hiraochi then Asada Tokunori
Ibaraki Prefecture: Egi Kazuyuki then Motohiro Onoda then Prince Kiyoshi Honba
Iwate Prefecture: Ichizo Hattori
Kagawa Prefecture: Tsunenori Tokuhisa
Kochi Prefecture: Ishida Eikichi then Hiroshi Shikakui
Kumamoto Prefecture: Kanetake Oura
Kyoto Prefecture: Baron Nobumichi Yamada then Baron Utsumi Tadakatsu 
Mie Prefecture: Terumi Tanabe
Miyagi Prefecture: Minoru Katsumata then Sukeo Kabayama 
Miyazaki Prefecture: Senda Sadakatsuki
Nagano Prefecture: Takasaki Chikaaki then Gondo Ka'nichi
Niigata Prefecture: Asada Tokunori then Minoru Katsumata
Oita Prefecture: Yasuhiko Hirayama then Shigetoo Sugimoto
Okinawa Prefecture: Shigeru Narahara
Osaka Prefecture: Utsumi Tadakatsu then Tokito Konkyo
Saga Prefecture: Akira Oyama
Saitama Prefecture: Tomi Senketaka
Shiname Prefecture: Michio Sokabe then Hikoji Nakamura
Tochigi Prefecture: Sato Nobu then Egi Kazuyuki then Sento Kiyoshi
Tokyo: Marquis Michitsune Koga then Viscount Okabe Nagahon
Toyama Prefecture: Ando Kinsuke then Tsurayuki Ishida
Yamagata Prefecture: Shuichi Kinoshita then Kikuchi Karasu

Events
January 17 – A first issue newspaper, Kahoku Shinpō was published in Miyagi Prefecture.
May – Opening of the Kyoto National Museum.
June 1 – Opening of Matsugishi Station in Chōshi, Chiba.
June 10 – Founding of the publishing company Jitsugyo no Nihon Sha.
June 18 – establishment of Kyoto University under the name Kyoto Imperial University.

Births
March 2 – Shizue Kato, politician and activist (d. 2001)
March 28 – Yusuke Hagihara, astronomer (d. 1979)
April 19 – Jiroemon Kimura, supercentenarian, oldest man ever, world's oldest living person from December 2012 to June 2013. (d. 2013)
October 10 – Shigeji Tsuboi, poet (d. 1975)
October 23 – Yae Ibuka, nurse (d. 1989)
November 12 – Eddie Imazu, art director (d. 1979)
November 17 – Kinichiro Sakaguchi, agricultural chemist and microbiologist (d. 1994)
November 28 – Chiyo Uno, writer and author (d. 1996)
December 8 – Prince Fushimi Hiroyoshi, naval officer (d. 1938; myocardial infarction)
December 26 – Unno Juza, writer, founding father of Japanese science fiction (d. 1949)

Deaths
August 24 – Mutsu Munemitsu, statesman and diplomat (b. 1844)
November 29 – Mitsukuri Rinsho, statesman and legal scholar (born 1846)

References

 
1890s in Japan
Years of the 19th century in Japan